Francis Hamilton Ingram (September 17, 1905 – April 15, 1985) was a Canadian professional ice hockey right winger who played three seasons in the National Hockey League (NHL) for the Chicago Black Hawks.

Playing career
Ingram played right wing for teams in the NHL, AHA, S-SJHL, M-Cup, PRHL, Al-Cup, S-SSHL, TBSHL, IHL, Can-Am, and the NMHL hockey leagues.

 Regina Boat Club from 1922 to 1923
 Regina Pats from 1923 to 1925
 Regina Victorias from 1925 to 1926
 Regina Capitals from 1926 to 1927
 St. Paul Saints from 1927 to 1929
 Chicago Black Hawks from 1929 to 1932
 Pittsburgh Yellowjackets from 1931 to 1932
 Philadelphia Arrows from 1931 to 1932
 Boston Cubs from 1932 to 1933
 Cleveland/Detroit from 1932 to 1933
 Detroit Olympics from 1933 to 1934
 Oklahoma City Warriors from 1933 to 1935
 Oklahoma/Minneapolis from 1935 to 1936
 St. Louis Flyers from 1936 to 1937
 Kansas City Greyhounds from 1937 to 1939
 Wichita Skyhawks from 1939 to 1940

Ingram was also a member of the 1935 to 1936 AHA Second All-Star Teams. Ingram retired from playing hockey in 1940.

Career statistics

Regular season and playoffs

References

External links

1905 births
1985 deaths
Canadian expatriate ice hockey players in the United States
Canadian ice hockey right wingers
Chicago Blackhawks players
Ice hockey people from Saskatchewan
Pittsburgh Yellow Jackets (IHL) players
Regina Pats players